Askhat Kadyrkulov (born 14 November 1974) is a former Kazakhstani professional footballer.

Club career
He made his professional debut in the Soviet Second League B in 1990 for FC Ak-kanat Uzynagash. He played two games in the 2000–01 UEFA Cup for PFC CSKA Moscow.

Career statistics

International goals

References

External links
 

1974 births
People from Almaty Region
Living people
Soviet footballers
Kazakhstani footballers
Association football midfielders
Kazakhstan international footballers
FC Kairat players
PFC CSKA Moscow players
Kazakhstani expatriate footballers
Expatriate footballers in Russia
Russian Premier League players
FC Zhenis Astana players
FC Shakhter Karagandy players
FC Zhetysu players
Kazakhstan Premier League players
Footballers at the 1998 Asian Games
Asian Games competitors for Kazakhstan